Khavaran-e Gharbi Rural District is in Khavaran District of Ray County, Tehran province, Iran. At the National Census of 2011, there were 7,409 inhabitants in 1,954 households at the following census of 2011. At the most recent census of 2016, the population of the rural district was 7,419 in 2,103 households. The largest of its five villages was Qasemabad-e Tehranchi, with 2,645 people.

References 

Ray County, Iran

Rural Districts of Tehran Province

Populated places in Tehran Province

Populated places in Ray County, Iran

fa:دهستان خاوران غربی